The 2020 Western Illinois Leathernecks football team represented Western Illinois University in the 2020–21 NCAA Division I FCS football season. They were led by third-year head coach Jared Elliott and played their home games at Hanson Field. They were a member of the Missouri Valley Football Conference (MVFC).

On April 5, 2021, Western Illinois announced that it was opting out of the remainder of the 2021 spring season due to a lack of available players.

Previous season

The Leathernecks finished the 2019 season 1–11, 1–7 in MVFC play to finish in a two-way tie for ninth place.

Schedule
Western Illinois's games scheduled against Southern Illinois (April 10) and South Dakota (April 17) were canceled when the Leathernecks opted out of the remainder of the season.

References

Western Illinois
Western Illinois Leathernecks football seasons
Western Illinois Leathernecks football